The Commerce, Services and Distribution Federation is a trade union representing service sector workers, particularly retail and distribution staff, in France.

The union was established in April 1973, at a conference in Issy-les-Moulineaux.  Relevant members transferred from the Food Federation and the Employees' Federation.  Like its predecessors, it affiliated to the General Confederation of Labour.  In its early years, the union campaigned for a 40-hour maximum working week, increased pay, and against Sunday working.

By 1994, the union had 15,178 members, but by 2019, this had risen to 44,980.

External links

References

Retail trade unions
Trade unions established in 1973
Trade unions in France